This is a list of bridges documented by the Historic American Engineering Record in Washington, D.C.

Bridges

References

List
List
Washington, D.C.
Bridges
Bridges